The Rafael Fire was a wildfire that started near Perkinsville, Arizona on June 18, 2021. The fire has burned  and was fully contained on July 15, 2021.

Events 

The Rafael Fire was first reported on June 18, 2021 at around 7:27 pm MST. The cause of the fire is believed to be due to lightning. On July 15, 2021, the Rafael Fire reached 100% containment.

Impact

Closures and Evacuations 
The Coconino National Forest was fully closed on June 23, 2021 due to fire danger, dry conditions, persistent wildfire activity, and limited availability of firefighting resources. The Coconino National Forest was reopened on July 6, 2021.

References 

2021 Arizona wildfires
June 2021 events in the United States
Wildfires in Arizona